WASP-75 is a F-type main-sequence star about 980 light-years away. WASP-75 is similar to the Sun in its concentration of heavy elements.

Planetary system
In 2013 a transiting hot Jupiter planet b was detected on a tight, circular orbit, and the planet was confirmed in 2018.

References

Aquarius (constellation)
F-type main-sequence stars
Planetary systems with one confirmed planet
Planetary transit variables
J22493256-1040320
BD-11 5929